Lake George is a lake in York County, New Brunswick, Canada adjacent to the rural community of Lake George.

See also
List of lakes of New Brunswick

References

Lakes of New Brunswick